Betula platyphylla, the Asian white birch or Japanese white birch, is a tree species in the family Betulaceae. It can be found in subarctic and temperate Asia in Japan, China, Korea, Mongolia, and Russian Far East and Siberia.

References

platyphylla
Trees of continental subarctic climate
Trees of China
Trees of Japan
Trees of Korea
Trees of Mongolia
Trees of Russia
Plants described in 1911